Stellar dynamics is the branch of astrophysics which describes in a statistical way the collective motions of stars subject to their mutual gravity. The essential difference from celestial mechanics is that the number of body 

Typical galaxies have upwards of millions of macroscopic gravitating bodies and countless number of neutrinos and perhaps other dark microscopic bodies. Also each star contributes more or less equally to the total gravitational field, whereas in celestial mechanics the pull of a massive body dominates any satellite orbits.

Connection with fluid dynamics 
Stellar dynamics also has connections to the field of plasma physics. The two fields underwent significant development during a similar time period in the early 20th century, and both borrow mathematical formalism originally developed in the field of fluid mechanics.

In accretion disks and stellar surfaces, the dense plasma or gas particles collide very frequently, and collisions result in equipartition and perhaps viscosity under magnetic field. We see various sizes for accretion disks and stellar atmosphere, both made of enormous number of microscopic particle mass, 

 at stellar surfaces,
 around Sun-like stars or km-sized stellar black holes, 
 around million solar mass black holes (about AU-sized) in centres of galaxies.

The system crossing time scale is long in stellar dynamics, where it is handy to note that

The long timescale means that, unlike gas particles in accretion disks, stars in galaxy disks very rarely see a collision in their stellar lifetime. However, galaxies collide occasionally in galaxy clusters, and stars have close encounters occasionally in star clusters.

As a rule of thumb, the typical scales concerned (see the Upper Portion of P.C.Budassi's Logarithmic Map of the Universe) are 
 for M13 Star Cluster,  
 for M31 Disk Galaxy, 
 for neutrinos in the Bullet Clusters, which is a merging system of N = 1000 galaxies.

Connection with Kepler problem and 3-body problem 
At a superficial level, all of stellar dynamics might be formulated as an N-body problem
by Newton's second law, where the equation of motion (EOM) for internal interactions of an isolated stellar system of N members can be written down as,

Here in the N-body system, any individual member,  is influenced by the gravitational potentials of the remaining  members.

In practice, except for in the highest performance computer simulations, it is not feasible to calculate rigorously the future of a large N system this way.  Also this EOM gives very little intuition. Historically, the methods utilised in stellar dynamics originated from the fields of both classical mechanics and statistical mechanics. In essence, the fundamental problem of stellar dynamics is the N-body problem, where the N members refer to the members of a given stellar system. Given the large number of objects in a stellar system, stellar dynamics can address both the global, statistical properties of many orbits as well as the specific data on the positions and velocities of individual orbits.

Concept of a gravitational potential field 
Stellar dynamics involves determining the gravitational potential of a substantial number of stars. The stars can be modeled as point masses whose orbits are determined by the combined interactions with each other. Typically, these point masses represent stars in a variety of clusters or galaxies, such as a Galaxy cluster, or a Globular cluster. Without getting a system's gravitational potential by adding all of the point-mass potentials in the system at every second, stellar dynamicists develop potential models that can accurately model the system while remaining computationally inexpensive. The gravitational potential, of a system is related to the acceleration and the gravitational field,  by:

whereas the potential is related to a (smoothened) mass density, via the Poisson's equation in the integral form 

or the more common differential form

An example of the Poisson Equation and escape speed in a uniform sphere 

Consider an analytically smooth spherical potential

The gravity is like the restoring force of harmonic oscillator inside the sphere, and Keplerian outside as described by the Heaviside functions.

We can fix the normalisation  by computing the corresponding density using the spherical Poisson Equation

where the enclosed mass 

Hence the potential model corresponds to a uniform sphere of radius , total mass  with

Key concepts 
While both the equations of motion and Poisson Equation can also take on non-spherical forms, depending on the coordinate system and the symmetry of the physical system, the essence is the same: 
The motions of stars in a galaxy or in a globular cluster are principally determined by the average distribution of the other, distant stars. The infrequent stellar encounters involve processes such as relaxation, mass segregation, tidal forces, and dynamical friction that influence the trajectories of the system's members.

Relativistic Approximations 

There are three related approximations made in the Newtonian EOM and Poisson Equation above.

SR and GR 
Firstly above equations neglect relativistic corrections, which are of order of 
 as typical stellar 3-dimensional speed,  km/s, is much below the speed of light.

Eddington Limit 
Secondly non-gravitational force is typically negligible in stellar systems.  For example, in the vicinity of a typical star the ratio of radiation-to-gravity force on a hydrogen atom or ion,

Loss cone 
Thirdly a star can be swallowed if coming within a few Schwarzschild radii of the black hole.  This radius of Loss is given by 

The loss cone can be visualised by considering infalling particles aiming to the black hole within a small solid angle (a cone in velocity). 
These particle with small  have small angular momentum per unit mass  Their small angular momentum (due to ) does not make a high enough barrier near  to force the particle to turn around.

The effective potential 
 is always positive infinity in Newtonian gravity.  However, in GR, it 
nosedives to minus infinity near  if 

Sparing a rigorous GR treatment, one can verify this  by computing the last stable circular orbit, where the effective potential is at an inflection point  using an approximate classical potential of a Schwarzschild black hole

Tidal disruption radius 

A star can be tidally torn by a heavier black hole when coming within the so-called Hill's radius of the black hole, inside which a star's surface gravity yields to the tidal force from the black hole, i.e.,

For typical black holes of  the destruction radius  where 0.001pc is the stellar spacing in the densest stellar systems (e.g., the nuclear star cluster in the Milky Way centre). Hence (main sequence) stars are generally too compact internally and too far apart spaced to be disrupted by even the strongest black hole tides in galaxy or cluster environment.

Radius of sphere of influence 
A particle of mass  with a relative speed V will be deflected when entering the (much larger) cross section  of a black hole. This so-called sphere of influence is loosely defined by, up to a Q-like fudge factor , 

hence for a Sun-like star we have, 

i.e., stars will neither be tidally disrupted nor physically hit/swallowed in a typical encounter with the black hole thanks to the high surface escape speed  from any solar mass star, comparable to the internal speed between galaxies in the Bullet Cluster of galaxies, and greater than the typical internal speed  inside all star clusters and in galaxies.

Connections between star loss cone and gravitational gas accretion physics 
First consider a heavy black hole of mass  is moving through a dissipational gas of (rescaled) thermal sound speed  and density , then every gas particle of mass m will likely transfer its relative momentum  to the BH when coming within a cross-section of radius  
In a time scale  that the black hole loses half of its streaming velocity, its mass may double by Bondi accretion, a process of capturing most of gas particles that enter its sphere of influence , dissipate kinetic energy by gas collisions and fall in the black hole.  The gas capture rate is  
 

Coming back to star tidal disruption and star capture by a (moving) black hole, setting , we could summarise the BH's growth rate from gas and stars,   
 with,  
 
because the black hole consumes a fractional/most part of star/gas particles passing its sphere of influence.

Gravitational dynamical friction 
Consider the case that a heavy black hole of mass  moves relative to a background of stars in random motion in 
a cluster of total mass  with a mean number density  within a typical size .

Intuition says that gravity causes the light bodies to accelerate and gain momentum and kinetic energy (see slingshot effect). By conservation of energy and momentum, we may conclude that the heavier body will be slowed by an amount to compensate. Since there is a loss of momentum and kinetic energy for the body under consideration, the effect is called dynamical friction.

After certain time of relaxations the heavy black hole's kinetic energy should be in equal partition with the less-massive background objects. The slow-down of the black hole can be described as

where  is called a dynamical friction time.

Dynamical friction time vs Crossing time in a virialised system 
Consider a Mach-1 BH, which travels initially at the sound speed , hence its Bondi radius  satisfies 

where 
the sound speed is  
with the prefactor  fixed by the fact that for a uniform spherical cluster of the mass density , half of a circular period is the time for "sound" to make a oneway crossing in its longest dimension, i.e., 

It is customary to call the "half-diameter" crossing time  the dynamical time scale.

the number of stars deflected by the BH's Bondi cross section per "diameter" crossing time is

More generally, the Equation of Motion of the BH at a general velocity  in the potential  of a sea of stars can be written as  

 and the Coulomb logarithm modifying factor  discounts friction on a supersonic moving BH with mass .  As a rule of thumb, it takes about a sound crossing  time to "sink" subsonic BHs, from the edge to the centre without overshooting, if they weigh more than 1/8th of the total cluster mass. Lighter and faster holes can stay afloat much longer.

More rigorous formulation of dynamical friction 

The full Chandrasekhar dynamical friction formula for the change in velocity of the object involves integrating over the phase space density of the field of matter and is far from transparent.

It reads as

where 

is the number of particles in an infinitesimal cylindrical volume of length  and a cross-section  within the black hole's sphere of influence.

Like the "Couloumb logarithm"  factors in the contribution of distant background particles, here the factor  also 
factors in the probability of finding a background slower-than-BH particle to contribute to the drag.

A background of elementary (gas or dark) particles can also induce dynamical friction, which scales with the mass density of the surrounding medium, ; the lower particle mass m is compensated by the higher number density n.  The more massive the object, the more matter will be pulled into the wake.

Summing up the gravitational drag of both collisional gas and collisionless stars, we have  

Here the "lagging-behind" fraction for gas  and for stars are given by 
 
where we have further assumed that the BH starts to move from time ; the gas is isothermal with sound speed ; the background stars have of (mass) density  in a Maxwell distribution of momentum  with a Gaussian distribution velocity spread  (called velocity dispersion, typically ).

Interestingly, the   dependence suggests that dynamical friction is from the gravitational pull of by the wake, which is induced by the gravitational focusing of the massive body in its two-body encounters with background objects.

We see the force is also proportional to the inverse square of the velocity at the high end, hence the fractional rate of energy loss drops rapidly at high velocities.
Dynamical friction is, therefore, unimportant for objects that move relativistically, such as photons. This can be rationalized by realizing that the faster the object moves through the media, the less time there is for a wake to build up behind it.  Friction tends to be the highest at the sound barrier, where .

Gravitational encounters and relaxation 
Stars in a stellar system will influence each other's trajectories due to strong and weak gravitational encounters. An encounter between two stars is defined to be strong/weak if their mutual potential energy at the closest passage is comparable/minuscule to their initial kinetic energy. Strong encounters are rare, and they are typically only considered important in dense stellar systems, e.g., a passing star can be sling-shot out by binary stars in the core of a globular cluster. This means that two stars need to come within a separation,

where we used the Virial Theorem, "mutual potential energy balances twice kinetic energy on average", i.e., "the pairwise potential energy per star balances with twice kinetic energy associated with the sound speed in three directions", 

where the factor  is the number of handshakes between a pair of stars without double-counting, the mean pair separation  is only about 40\% of the radius of the uniform sphere.
Note also the similarity of the

Mean free path 
The mean free path of strong encounters in a typically  stellar system is then

i.e., it takes about  radius crossings for a typical star to come within a cross-section  to be deflected from its path completely.  Hence the mean free time of a strong encounter is much longer than the crossing time .

Weak encounters 
Weak encounters have a more profound effect on the evolution of a stellar system over the course of many passages. The effects of gravitational encounters can be studied with the concept of relaxation time.  A simple example illustrating relaxation is two-body relaxation, where a star's orbit is altered due to the gravitational interaction with another star.

Initially, the subject star travels along an orbit with initial velocity, that is perpendicular to the impact parameter, the distance of closest approach, to the field star whose gravitational field will affect the original orbit. Using Newton's laws, the change in the subject star's velocity, is approximately equal to the acceleration at the impact parameter, multiplied by the time duration of the acceleration.

The number of "half-diameter" crossings for an average star to relax in a stellar system of  objects is approximately 

from a more rigorous calculation than the above mean free time estimates for strong deflection.

The answer makes sense because there is no relaxation for a single body or 2-body system. There is no relaxation for an isolated binary, and the relaxation is the fastest for a 16-body system; it takes about 2.5 crossings for orbits to scatter each other. A system with  have much smoother potential, typically takes  weak encounters to build a strong deflection to change orbital energy significantly.

Relation between friction and relaxation 
Clearly that the dynamical friction of a black hole is much faster than the relaxation time by roughly a factor , but these two are very similar for a cluster of black holes, 

For a star cluster or galaxy cluster with, say,  we have . Hence encounters of members in these stellar or galaxy clusters are significant during the typical 10 Gyr lifetime.

On the other hand, typical galaxy with, say,  stars, would have a crossing time  and their relaxation time is much longer than the age of the Universe.  This justifies modelling galaxy potentials with mathematically smooth functions, neglecting two-body encounters throughout the lifetime of typical galaxies.  And inside such a typical galaxy the dynamical friction and accretion on stellar black holes over a 10-Gyr Hubble time change the black hole's velocity and mass by only an insignificant fraction

if the black hole makes up less than 0.1% of the total galaxy mass .  Especially when , we see that a typical star never experiences an encounter, hence stays on its orbit in a smooth galaxy potential.

The dynamical friction or relaxation time identifies collisionless vs. collisional particle systems. Dynamics on timescales much less than the relaxation time is effectively collisionless because typical star will deviate from its initial orbit size by a tiny fraction .  They are also identified as systems where subject stars interact with a smooth gravitational potential as opposed to the sum of point-mass potentials.  The accumulated effects of two-body relaxation in a galaxy can lead to what is known as mass segregation, where more massive stars gather near the center of clusters, while the less massive ones are pushed towards the outer parts of the cluster.

A Spherical-Cow Summary of Continuity Eq. in Collisional and Collisionless Processes 

Having gone through the details of the rather complex interactions of particles in a gravitational system, it is always helpful to zoom out and extract some generic theme, at an affordable price of rigour, so carry on with a lighter load.

First important concept is "gravity balancing motion" near the perturber and for the background as a whole 
 
being ambiguous whether the geometry of the system is a thin/thick gas/stellar disk or a (non)-uniform stellar/dark sphere with or without a boundary, and about the subtle distinctions among the kinetic energies from the local Circular rotation speed , radial infall speed , globally isotropic or anisotropic random motion  in one or three directions, or the (non)-uniform isotropic Sound speed  to emphasize of the logic behind the order of magnitude of the friction time scale.

Second we can recap very loosely summarise the various processes so far of collisional and collisionless gas/star or dark matter by Spherical cow style Continuity Equation on any generic quantity Q of the system:
 
where the  sign is generally negative except for the (accreting) mass M, and the Mean free path  or the friction time  can be due to direct molecular viscosity from a physical collision Cross section, or due to gravitational scattering (bending/focusing/Sling shot) of particles; generally the influenced area is the greatest of the competing processes of Bondi accretion, Tidal disruption, and Loss cone capture,

E.g., in case Q is the perturber's mass , then we can estimate the Dynamical friction time via the (gas/star) Accretion rate 
 
where we have applied the relations motion-balancing-gravity.

In the limit the perturber is just 1 of the N background particle, this friction time is identified with the (gravitational) Relaxation time.  Again all Coulomb logarithm etc are suppressed without changing the estimations from these qualitative equations.

For the rest of Stellar dynamics, we will consistently work on precise calculations through primarily Worked Examples, by neglecting gravitational friction and relaxation of the perturber, working in the limit  as approximated true in most galaxies on the 14Gyrs Hubble time scale, even though this is sometimes violated for some clusters of stars or clusters of galaxies.of the cluster.

A concise 1-page summary of some main equations in Stellar dynamics and Accretion disc physics are shown here, where one attempts to be more rigorous on the qualitative equations above.

Connections to statistical mechanics and plasma physics 
The statistical nature of stellar dynamics originates from the application of the kinetic theory of gases to stellar systems by physicists such as James Jeans in the early 20th century. The Jeans equations, which describe the time evolution of a system of stars in a gravitational field, are analogous to Euler's equations for an ideal fluid, and were derived from the collisionless Boltzmann equation. This was originally developed by Ludwig Boltzmann to describe the non-equilibrium behavior of a thermodynamic system. Similarly to statistical mechanics, stellar dynamics make use of distribution functions that encapsulate the information of a stellar system in a probabilistic manner. The single particle phase-space distribution function, is defined in a way such that

where  represents the probability of finding a given star with position  around a differential volume  and velocity  around a differential velocity space volume . The distribution function is normalized (sometimes) such that integrating it over all positions and velocities will equal N, the total number of bodies of the system. For collisional systems, Liouville's theorem is applied to study the microstate of a stellar system, and is also commonly used to study the different statistical ensembles of statistical mechanics.

Convention and notation in case of a thermal distribution 
In most of stellar dynamics literature, it is convenient to adopt the convention that the particle mass is unity in solar mass unit , hence a particle's momentum and velocity are identical, i.e.,

For example, the thermal velocity distribution of air molecules (of typically 15 times the proton mass per molecule) in a room of constant temperature  would have a Maxwell distribution

where the energy per unit mass  where 

The CBE 
In plasma physics, the collisionless Boltzmann equation is referred to as the Vlasov equation, which is used to study the time evolution of a plasma's distribution function.

The Boltzmann equation is often written more generally with the Liouville operator  as

Whereas Jeans applied the collisionless Boltzmann equation, along with Poisson's equation, to a system of stars interacting via the long range force of gravity, Anatoly Vlasov applied Boltzmann's equation with Maxwell's equations to a system of particles interacting via the Coulomb Force. Both approaches separate themselves from the kinetic theory of gases by introducing long-range forces to study the long term evolution of a many particle system. In addition to the Vlasov equation, the concept of Landau damping in plasmas was applied to gravitational systems by Donald Lynden-Bell to describe the effects of damping in spherical stellar systems.

A nice property of f(t,x,v) is that many other dynamical quantities can be formed by its moments, e.g., the total mass, local density, pressure, and mean velocity.  Applying the collisionless Boltzmann equation, these moments are then related by various forms of continuity equations, of which most notable are the Jeans equations and Virial theorem.

Probability-weighted moments and hydrostatic equilibrium 
Jeans computed the weighted velocity of the Boltzmann Equation after integrating over velocity space  and obtain the Momentum (Jeans) Eqs. of a opulation (e.g., gas, stars, dark matter):

The general version of Jeans equation, involving (3 x 3) velocity moments is cumbersome.  
It only becomes useful or solvable if we could drop some of these moments, epecially drop the off-diagonal cross terms for systems of high symmetry, and also drop net rotation or net inflow speed everywhere.

The isotropic version is also called 
Hydrostatic equilibrium equation where balancing pressure gradient with gravity; the isotropic version works for axisymmetric disks as well, after replacing the derivative dr with vertical coordinate dz.  It means that we could measure the gravity (of dark matter) by observing the gradients of the velocity dispersion and the number density of stars.

Applications and examples 

Stellar dynamics is primarily used to study the mass distributions within stellar systems and galaxies. Early examples of applying stellar dynamics to clusters include Albert Einstein's 1921 paper applying the virial theorem to spherical star clusters and Fritz Zwicky's 1933 paper applying the virial theorem specifically to the Coma Cluster, which was one of the original harbingers of the idea of dark matter in the universe. The Jeans equations have been used to understand different observational data of stellar motions in the Milky Way galaxy. For example, Jan Oort utilized the Jeans equations to determine the average matter density in the vicinity of the solar neighborhood, whereas the concept of asymmetric drift came from studying the Jeans equations in cylindrical coordinates.

Stellar dynamics also provides insight into the structure of galaxy formation and evolution. Dynamical models and observations are used to study the triaxial structure of elliptical galaxies and suggest that prominent spiral galaxies are created from galaxy mergers. Stellar dynamical models are also used to study the evolution of active galactic nuclei and their black holes, as well as to estimate the mass distribution of dark matter in galaxies.

A unified thick disk potential 

Consider an oblate potential in cylindrical coordinates 

where  are (positive) vertical and radial length scales.  
Despite its complexity, we can easily see some limiting properties of the model.

First we can see the total mass of the system is  because  

when we take the large radii limit 
, so that 

We can also show that some special cases of this unified potential become the potential of the Kuzmin razor-thin disk, that of the Point mass , and that of a uniform-Needle mass distribution:

A worked example of gravity vector field in a thick disk 

First consider the vertical gravity at the boundary, 

Note that both the potential and the vertical gravity are continuous across the boundaries, hence no razor disk at the boundaries.
Thanks to the fact that at the boundary,  is continuous.  Apply Gauss's theorem by integrating the vertical force over the entire disk upper and lower boundaries, we have 

confirming that  takes the meaning of the total disk mass.

Density of a thick disk from Poisson Equation 

Insert in the cylindrical Poisson eq. 

which drops with radius, and is zero beyond  and uniform along the z-direction within the boundary.

Surface density and mass of a thick disk 

Integrating over the entire thick disc of uniform thickness , we find the surface density and the total mass as 

This confirms that the absence of extra razor thin discs at the boundaries.  In the limit, this thick disc potential reduces to that of a razor-thin Kuzmin disk, for which we can verify .

Oscillation frequencies in a thick disk 

To find the vertical and radial oscillation frequencies, we do a Taylor expansion of potential around the midplane.

and we find the circular speed  and the vertical and radial epicycle frequencies to be given by

Interestingly the rotation curve  is solid-body-like near the centre , and is Keplerian far away.

At large radii three frequencies satisfy 
.

In the case that , the density is zero everywhere except uniform needle between  along the z-axis.

If we further require , then we recover a well-known property for closed ellipse orbits in point mass potential,

A worked example for neutrinos in galaxies 

For example, the phase space distribution function of non-relativistic neutrinos of mass m anywhere will not exceed the maximum value set by

where the Fermi-Dirac statistics says there are at most 6 flavours of neutrinos within a volume  and a velocity volume .

Let's approximate the distribution is at maximum, i.e., 

where  such that , respectively, is the potential energy of at the centre or the edge of the gravitational bound system.  The corresponding neutrino mass density, assume spherical, would be

which reduces to

Take the simple case , and estimate the density at the centre  with an escape speed , we have

neutrinos in clusters with  could make up  times cosmic background density.

By the way the freeze-out cosmic neutrinos in your room have a non-thermal random momentum , and do not follow a Maxwell distribution, and are not in thermal equilibrium with the air molecules because of the extremely low cross-section of neutrino-baryon interactions.

A Recap on Harmonic Motions in Uniform Sphere Potential 

Consider building a steady state model of the fore-mentioned uniform sphere of density  and potential 

where  is the speed to escape to the edge .

First a recap on motion "inside" the uniform sphere potential.
Inside this constant density core region, individual stars go on resonant harmonic oscillations of angular frequency  with 
Loosely speaking our goal is to put stars on a weighted distribution of orbits with various energies , i.e., the phase space density or distribution function, such that their overall stellar number density reproduces the constant core, hence their collective "steady-state" potential.  Once this is reached, we call the system is a self-consistent equilibrium.

Example on Jeans theorem and CBE on Uniform Sphere Potential 

Generally for a time-independent system, Jeans theorem predicts that  is an implicit function of the position and velocity through a functional dependence on "constants of motion".

For the uniform sphere, a solution for the Boltzmann Equation, written in spherical coordinates  and its velocity components  is

where  is a normalisation constant, which has the dimension of (mass) density. And we define a (positive enthalpy-like dimension ) Quantity 

It is easy to see in spherical coordinates that

Insert the potential and these definitions of the orbital energy E and angular momentum J and its z-component Jz along every stellar orbit, we have

To verify the above  being constants of motion in our spherical potential, we note

 for any "steady state" potential.

 which reduces to  around the z-axis of any axisymmetric potential, where .

Likewise the x and y components of the angular momentum are also conserved for a spherical potential.  Hence .

So for any time-independent spherical potential (including our uniform sphere model), 
the orbital energy E and angular momentum J and its z-component Jz along every stellar orbit satisfy

Hence using the chain rule, we have

i.e., so that CBE is satisfied, i.e., our 

is a solution to the Collisionless Boltzmann Equation for our static spherical potential.

A worked example on moments of distribution functions in a uniform spherical cluster 

We can find out various moments of the above distribution function, reformatted as with the help of three Heaviside functions, 
 
once we input the expression for the earlier potential  inside , or even better the speed to "escape from r to the edge"  of a uniform sphere   
Clearly the factor  in the DF (distribution function) is well-defined only if , which implies a narrow range on radius  and excludes high velocity particles, e.g., from the distribution function (DF, i.e., phase space density).

In fact, the positivity carves the  left-half of an ellipsoid in the  velocity space ("velocity ellipsoid"), 

where  is  rescaled by the function  or  respectively.

The velocity ellipsoid (in this case) has rotational symmetry around the r axis or  axis.  It is more squashed (in this case) away from the radial direction, hence more tangentially anisotropic because everywhere , except at the origin, where the ellipsoid looks isotropic. Now we compute the moments of the phase space.
 
E.g., the resulting density (moment) is

is indeed a spherical (angle-independent) and uniform (radius-independent) density inside the edge, where the normalisation constant .

The streaming velocity is computed as the weighted mean of the velocity vector

where the global average (indicated by the overline bar) of flow implies uniform pattern of flat azimuthal rotation, but zero net streaming everywhere in the meridional  plane.

Incidentally, the angular momentum global average of this flat-rotation sphere is 

Note global average of centre of mass does not change, so  due to global momentum conservation in each rectangular direction , and this does not contradict the global non-zero rotation.

Likewise the rms velocity in the rotation direction is computed by a weighted mean as follows, E.g.,

Here

Likewise

So the pressure tensor or dispersion tensor is

with zero off-diagonal terms because of the symmetric velocity distribution.  
Note while there is no Dark Matter in producing the previous flat rotation curve, 
the price is shown by the reduction factor  in the random velocity spread in the azimuthal direction.

The larger tangential kinetic energy than that of radial motion seen in the diagonal dispersions is often phrased by an anisotropy parameter

a positive anisotropy would have meant that radial motion dominated, and a negative anisotropy means that tangential motion dominates (as in this uniform sphere).

A worked example of Virial Theorem 

Twice kinetic energy per unit mass of the above uniform sphere is

The average Virial per unit mass can be computed from averaging its local value , which yields

as required by the Virial Theorem.  For this self-gravitating sphere, we can also verify that the virial per unit mass equals the averages of half of the potential 

Hence we have verified the validity of Virial Theorem for a uniform sphere under self-gravity, i.e., the gravity due to the mass density of the stars is also the gravity that stars move in self-consistently; no additional dark matter halo contributes to its potential, for example.

A worked example of Jeans Equation in a uniform sphere 

Jeans Equation is a relation on how the pressure gradient of a system should be balancing the potential gradient for an equilibrium galaxy.  In our uniform sphere, the potential gradient or gravity is

The radial pressure gradient

The reason for the discrepancy is partly due to centrifugal force

and partly due to anisotropic pressure

so  at the very centre, 
but the two balance at radius , and then 

Now we can verify that

Here the 1st line above is essentially the Jeans equation in the r-direction, which reduces to the 2nd line, the Jeans equation in an anisotropic (aka ) rotational (aka ) axisymmetric sphere (aka ) after much coordinate manipulations of the dispersion tensor; similar equation of motion can be obtained for the two tangential direction, e.g., which are useful in modelling   ocean currents on the rotating earth surface or angular momentum transfer in accretion disks, where the frictional term  is important. 
The fact that the l.h.s.  means that 
the force is balanced on the r.h.s. for this uniform (aka ) spherical model of a galaxy (cluster) to stay in a steady state (aka time-independent equilibrium  everywhere) statically (aka with zero flow  everywhere).  Note systems like accretion disk can have a steady net radial inflow  everywhere at all time.

A worked example of Jeans equation in a thick disk 

Consider again the thick disk potential in the above example. 
If the density is that of a gas fluid, then the pressure would be zero at the boundary .  To find the peak of the pressure, we note that 

So the fluid temperature per unit mass, i.e., the 1-dimensional velocity dispersion squared would be 

Along the rotational z-axis, 

which is clearly the highest at the centre and zero at the boundaries .  Both the pressure and the dispersion peak at the midplane .  In fact the hottest and densest point is the centre, where

A recap on worked examples on Jeans Eq., Virial and Phase space density 

Having looking at the a few applications of Poisson Eq. and Phase space density and especially the Jeans equation, we can extract a general theme, again using the Spherical cow approach.

Jeans equation links gravity with pressure gradient, it is a generalisation of the Eq. of Motion for single particles.  While Jeans equation can be solved in disk systems, the most user-friendly version of the Jeans eq. is the spherical anisotropic version for a static  frictionless system , hence the local velocity spead 
 everywhere for each of the three directions .
One can project the phase space into these moments, which is easily if in a highly spherical system, which admits conservations of energy  and angular momentum J.  The boundary of the system sets the integration range of the velocity bound in the system.

In summary, in the spherical Jeans eq., 

which matches the expectation from the Virial theorem , 
or in other words, the  kinetic energy of an equilibrium equals the average kinetic energy on circular orbits with purely transverse motion.

See also

Stellar classification
Boltzmann equation
Dynamical friction
Jeans equations
Mass segregation (astronomy)
N-body problem
Virial theorem
Stellar kinematics
Poisson's Equation
Vector Calculus
Accretion Disc
Bondi Accretion
Relaxation (physics)

Further reading
 Dynamics and Evolution of Galactic Nuclei, D. Merritt (2013). Princeton University Press.
 Galactic Dynamics, J. Binney and S. Tremaine (2008). Princeton University Press.
 Gravitational N-Body Simulations: Tools and Algorithms, S. Aarseth (2003). Cambridge University Press.
 Principles of Stellar Dynamics, S. Chandrasekhar (1960). Dover.

References

 
Gravity
Dynamics